Elections to Colchester Borough Council were held on 5 May 1988 alongside other local elections across the United Kingdom.

This was the first Colchester local election contested by the newly formed Liberal Democrats following the merger of the SDP and Liberal Party.

At the election, the Liberal Democrats emerged as the largest party on the council for the first time since its creation in 1973.

Summary

Ward results

Berechurch

Castle

Dedham

East Donyland

Fordham

Harbour

Lexden

Marks Tey

Mile End

New Town

Prettygate

Shrub End

St. Andrew's

St. Anne's

St. John's

St. Mary's

Stanway

Tiptree

West Mersea

Wivenhoe

References

1988
1988 English local elections
1980s in Essex